Tata AIG General Insurance Company Limited is an Indian general insurance company and a joint venture between the Tata Group and American International Group (AIG). Tata Group holds a 74 percent stake in the insurance venture with AIG holding the balance of 26 percent. 

Tata AIG General Insurance Company, which started its operations in India on 22 January 2001, provides insurance to individuals and corporates. It offers a range of general insurance products including insurance for automobile, home, personal accident, travel, energy, marine, property and casualty as well as specialized financial lines. The company's products are available through distribution channels like agents, brokers, banks (Through bank assurance tie ups), and direct channels like 
telemarketing, digital marketing, worksite etc.

History

Tata AIG General Insurance Company Limited (Tata AIG General) is a business collaboration of the Tata Group and American International Group, Inc. (AIG). This joint venture has started its operations in India from 22 January 2001. The company provides corporate and personal insurance services and automotive insurance as well.

The organization offers general insurance. The commercial sector covers Energy, Marine, Property and specialized Financial covers. The consumer insurance service offers a variety of general Insurance products such as insurance for Automobiles, personal accident, casualty, home, health and travel.

The company has made the availability for its services from end to end channels of distribution like agents, banks (through bancassurance tie ups), brokers and direct channels like tele-marketing, e-commerce, website, etc.

In 2019,Indian Bank had joined hands with company to offer the latter’s diverse range of general insurance policies for the benefit of the bank’s customers by way of protection, wealth creation and savings and as per the agreement Tata AIG General Insurance will work with the bank for sales training, product support and ensuring smooth operational processes.

In 2020,the company had launched Tata AIG Tara, which is an insurance service through WhatsApp and with the help of artificial intelligence this initiative will offer customers a variety of solutions to their policy related queries in a timely, efficient and precise way. This will help customers to access their policies in a virtual form,  avail policy documents, request and receive renewal details, make premium payment online, seek support on claims, locate network hospitals and garages, make changes in address or any other personal details and can be used as a forum to buy a health or motor policy of their choice.

The headquarters is in Mumbai. The company is active in more than 160 locations.

Product and services

Tata AIG Car Insurance
Tata AIG Two Wheeler Insurance
Tata AIG Health Insurance
Tata AIG Travel insurance
Tata AIG Home Insurance
Tata AIG Property Insurance
Tata AIG Marine Insurance
Tata AIG Liability Insurance

In 2020,the company had launched new policy called 'AutoSafe',which offers usage-based insurance cover to private car owners which will help reduce the overall premium payout. The app helps policyholders by saving on premium amount by providing an option to select the kilometers-driven, promoting safe driving and works as anti-theft device as it comes with a GPS-based tracking facility and uses telematics-based next-generation application system and as a device to track the usage of the car and decide on the premium amount.
The app helps in tracking the distance covered by the vehicle, running speed and other driving related features and also offers extra kilometers for efficient driving practices at the time of the renewal and is available on all policies offered on personal accidental cover to the tune of Rs 15 lakh for owner and driver. The app will help Policyholders to benefit from flexible kilometer-based premium as it will promote savings and policyholders can choose between 2,500, 5,000, 7500, 10,000, 15,000 and 20,000 km and if all the kilometers is exhausted within the policy time period it has a option of top-up km between 500 and 1,500 km. The device is GPS-enabled which is linked to the mobile app which will help in recording all information, tracking the distance travelled and generates reports about vehicle condition or driving habits of the policyholder and is fitted or linked to the car as the insurance policy becomes valid and must be held during the valid period of the policy and comes with motion sensor and generates fuel based saving reports in addition to monitoring hard-braking, night time driving and acceleration apart from guarding against fuel slippage and dangerous driving habits.

In 2021,company launched Tata AIA Life Fortune Guarantee Plus, a flexible, non-linked, non-participating savings plan which offers policy holders guaranteed long-term income along with comprehensive protection cover and in addition to long-term guaranteed income for future financial needs, the plan also covers health protection in the event of the policyholder getting diagnosed with a Critical diseases. This scheme offers two income options – Regular Income or Regular Income with an inbuilt Critical Illness benefit wherein  all future premiums stand waived if the insured is diagnosed with a Critical Illness during the premium payment term and guaranteed minimum income will commence which frees the policyholder on worrying about his income and focus on his health recovery. The policyholder also has the option to choose the income frequency between monthly or annual payout options and as per the terms of the policy the guaranteed income starts from the 6th Policy year for a period ranging from 20 to 45 years and they can select a premium payment term between 5-12 years, and the single premium payment option offers the freedom to go for Joint Life coverage which ensures that policy continues even if one of the two passes away. Additionally it offers an benefit of inbuilt Return of Premium benefit which allows the policyholder to get the total premiums paid (excluding loading for modal premiums and discount) after the duration of income Period.

References

General insurance companies of India
Tata Group subsidiaries
Multinational joint-venture companies
Financial services companies based in Mumbai
2001 establishments in Maharashtra
Indian companies established in 2001
Financial services companies established in 2001